Marquette King Jr. (born October 26, 1988) is an American football punter for the Arlington Renegades of the XFL. He played college football at Fort Valley State and was signed by the Oakland Raiders as an undrafted free agent in 2012. King led the NFL in punting yards in 2014.

Early life
King was born and raised in Macon, Georgia by his parents, Audrey and Marquette King Sr. He has a younger sister named Jasmine. He began punting in high school. As a child, he loved football and wanted to become a wide receiver. King practiced after his football practices at Rutland High School and asked teammates to join. After having his teammates decline his invitation, he decided to try punting during his free time, challenging himself to see how far he could kick. His high school coach soon learned of his ability and named him—in addition to his role as wide receiver—the team's punter.

College career
King attended Fort Valley State University where he was originally recruited as a wide receiver. However, he could not find playing time at the position. During his junior year, when his new head coach learned that King practiced punting in his spare time, he threatened to revoke King's scholarship unless he focused on becoming a full-time punter. King recounted this, and said "When [the coach] threatened to take my scholarship away from me to focus on being a punter I was like, 'All right, well, if you want to take my scholarship away from me, well, I'm [going to] find a way to make this position look fun.'" In his senior year, King was an All-First-team Southern Intercollegiate Athletic Conference member and the 2011 FVSU Wildcats Most Valuable Player. During the 2011 season, King punted 80 yards against Bethune-Cookman University. During the 2011 season, King led the SIAC Conference in punting with a 43 yards per punt average, with 21 punts landing inside his opponents' 20-yard-line. Sixteen of his punts yielded 50 yards or more. King competed in the first annual NFLPA Collegiate Bowl in 2012.

Professional career

Oakland Raiders

After going undrafted in the 2012 NFL Draft, the Oakland Raiders had King try out for the team. On 
April 29, 2012, the Oakland Raiders signed King to a three-year, $1.36 million contract. In training camp, King took most of the punting snaps due to an earlier injury to veteran Shane Lechler. King impressed the coaches enough to be kept on the roster but was placed on injured reserve for the entire 2012 NFL season.

With Lechler signing a free-agent contract with the Houston Texans, King competed for the Oakland Raiders punting job during the 2013 preseason with experienced veteran Chris Kluwe. King won the punting job, and Kluwe was cut at the conclusion of the preseason. During the 2013 season, King led the league in gross yards per punt, with 48.9.

In 2014, King led the league in punting yards and total punts, with 4,930 on 109 punts. These numbers also set single-season Oakland Raiders franchise records.

On March 11, 2015, King signed a one-year, $1.54 million contract to remain with the Raiders. He was named the AFC Special Teams Player of the Week in Week 15.

On February 29, 2016, the Raiders signed King to a five-year, $16.50 million extension with $12.50 million guaranteed and a signing bonus of $250,000. On September 23, 2016, King was fined $18,231 for a touchdown saving horse-collar tackle on Eric Weems during a Week 2 game against the Atlanta Falcons. During the 2016 season, King was named the AFC Special Teams Player of the Week in Week 7.

During King's career, he became noted by sports media outlets for his attention-grabbing celebrations and dances following punts.

On March 30, 2018, the Raiders released King. Leading up to and upon his release, several of his teammates were publicly critical of King, especially Bruce Irvin and Cordarrelle Patterson. Patterson said of King: "I like [Marquette King], he’s a little different, but he’s a good guy. He loves his wine. He always called me after every game like 'let’s go get some wine'. People didn’t like him though. He was kinda like a diva, but he wasn’t. He really didn’t show it that much, but like, he was crazy, man. He had fun though. I respect him as a person, but he just did things a little different…"

Denver Broncos
On April 5, 2018, the Denver Broncos signed King to a three-year contract worth $7 million. He was placed on injured reserve on October 6, 2018, with a thigh injury. Two days later, the Broncos reached an injury settlement with King and he was released.

St. Louis Battlehawks 
King was selected by the St. Louis Battlehawks in the 2020 XFL Supplemental Draft on November 22, 2019. He played in 5 games with them, and had 19 punts for 868 yards. He had his contract terminated when the league suspended operations on April 10, 2020.

Free agency 
During the 2021 offseason, it was rumored that the Arizona Cardinals were considering signing King, who had publicly trained in Arizona since 2019. The Cardinals ultimately did not sign him.

Arlington Renegades 
King was selected in the 2023 XFL Draft by the Arlington Renegades.

NFL career statistics

|-
! style="text-align:center;"| 2012
! style="text-align:center;"| OAK
| 0 || colspan=6| did not play due to injury
|-
! style="text-align:center;"| 2013
! style="text-align:center;"| OAK
| 16 || 84 || 4,107 || style="background:#cfecec;"| 48.9 || 40.1 || 23 || 11 
|-
! style="text-align:center;"| 2014
! style="text-align:center;"| OAK
| 16 || style="background:#cfecec;"| 109 || style="background:#cfecec;"| 4,930 || 45.2 || 40.0 || 31 || 3
|-
! style="text-align:center;"| 2015
! style="text-align:center;"| OAK
| 16 || 83 || 3,697 || 44.5 || 40.7 || 40 || 4 
|-
! style="text-align:center;"| 2016
! style="text-align:center;"| OAK
| 16 || 81 || 3,937 || 48.6 || 41.4 || 34 || 9
|-
! style="text-align:center;"| 2017
! style="text-align:center;"| OAK
| 16 || 69 || 3,270 || 47.4 || 42.7 || 28 || 6 
|-
! style="text-align:center;"| 2018
! style="text-align:center;"| DEN
| 4 || 20 || 881 || 44.1 || 39.7 || 7 || 1 
|- class="sortbottom"
! style="text-align:center;" colspan="2"|Career || 84 || 446 || 20,822 || 46.7 || 41.1 || 163 || 34
|}

Sources:

References

External links
 Oakland Raiders biography

1988 births
Living people
African-American players of American football
Sportspeople from Macon, Georgia
Players of American football from Georgia (U.S. state)
American football punters
Fort Valley State Wildcats football players
Oakland Raiders players
Denver Broncos players
St. Louis BattleHawks players
Arlington Renegades players
21st-century African-American sportspeople
20th-century African-American people